Keith Diamond (born Keith Vincent Constantine Alexander; March 11, 1950 – January 18, 1997) was an American songwriter and producer who worked with artists such as Donna Summer, Michael Bolton, Sheena Easton, Mick Jagger, Natural Selection and Don Johnson. Diamond also produced and co-wrote Billy Ocean's "Suddenly", "Caribbean Queen (No More Love On The Run)", "Loverboy" and "Mystery Lady" as well as producing and managing groups such as Starpoint and Fredrick Thomas. Keith Diamond also produced and co-wrote James Ingram's album entitled Never Felt So Good in 1986, at the request of Quincy Jones who was tied up with scoring the film The Color Purple. Diamond's composition of "Red Hot Lover" on Ingram's Never Felt So Good was inspired by Lourett Russell Grant, a musical recording artist Diamond had a personal relationship with.

Early life and career
Diamond moved to London to pursue a career as a musician and producer in 1969. Signed on as a songwriter by the publisher Zomba after he moved to New York in 1980, he then became known for his streamlined rhythm-and-blues pop style.

Death
Diamond died in his Manhattan home on January 18, 1997, of a sudden heart attack.

References

1950 births
1997 deaths
20th-century Trinidad and Tobago male singers
20th-century Trinidad and Tobago singers
Trinidad and Tobago record producers
Post-disco musicians